The 1960–61 Copa del Generalísimo was the 59th staging of the Spanish Cup. The competition began on 12 October 1960 and concluded on 2 July 1961 with the final.

First round

|}
Tiebreaker

|}

Round of 32

|}
Tiebreaker

|}

Round of 16

|}
Tiebreaker

|}

Quarter-finals

|}

Semi-finals

|}

Final

|}

References

External links
 rsssf.com
 linguasport.com

Copa del Rey seasons
Copa del Rey
Copa